Vincas Bartuška (14 January 1901 – 11 September 1988) was a Lithuanian footballer who competed in the 1924 Summer Olympics.

Bartuška played in the first ever Lithuanian international football match on 26 June 1923 against Estonia, a year later he was representing his country at the 1924 Summer Olympics held in Paris, France, where they lost 0-9 against Switzerland in the first round. Bartuška in total played seven times for his country and three of them were as captain.

References

1901 births
1988 deaths
Lithuanian footballers
Lithuania international footballers
Footballers at the 1924 Summer Olympics
Olympic footballers of Lithuania
Association football defenders